Jaroslav Pížl (born 5 November 1961) is a Czech poet, prose writer, lyricist and musician.

Life and career
Jaroslav Pížl studied acting and writing at the Prague Conservatory. Since 1995 he has worked at the Jaroslav Ježek Conservatory in Prague where he teaches acting  and singing interpretation. In 1992 he received the Jiří Orten Award  for the book of Manévry. During the 1990s he released four poetry collections: Exteriéry (Exteriors) (1994), Svět zvířat (Animal World) (1996), Vodní hry (Water Games) (1998), and Rodinný život (Family Life) (2000). He teaches poetry both in the Czech Republic and abroad (Germany, Austria, Denmark, France, USA).

Awards
 1992 Jiří Orten Award

Bibliography
 Manévry. Praha: Nakladatelství Q, 1992. .
 Exteriéry. Praha: Bonaventura, 1994. .
 Svět zvířat. Praha: Torst, 1996. . 
 Vodní hry. Brno: Petrov, 1998. .
 Rodinný život. Brno: Petrov, 2000.  .
 Sběratelé knih. Brno: Petrov, 2004. .  
 Adrenalin. Brno: Druhé město, 2010. .

References 

1961 births
Living people
Czech novelists
Czech poets
21st-century novelists
Writers from Prague